The Southeast Asian Games, also known as the SEA Games, is a biennial multi-sport event involving participants from the current 11 countries of Southeast Asia. The games are under the regulation of the Southeast Asian Games Federation with supervision by the International Olympic Committee (IOC) and the Olympic Council of Asia (OCA).

The Southeast Asian Games is one of the five subregional Games of the Olympic Council of Asia (OCA). The others are the Central Asian Games, the East Asian Youth Games, the South Asian Games, and the West Asian Games.

History
The Southeast Asian Games owes its origins to the South East Asian Peninsular Games or SEAP Games. On 22 May 1958, delegates from the countries in Southeast Asian Peninsula attending the Asian Games in Tokyo, Japan had a meeting and agreed to establish a sports organization. The SEAP Games was conceptualized by Luang Sukhum Nayapradit, then vice-president of the Thailand Olympic Committee. The proposed rationale was that a regional sports event will help promote co-operation, understanding, and relations among countries in the Southeast Asian region.

Six countries, Burma (now Myanmar), Kampuchea (now Cambodia), Laos, Malaya (now Malaysia), Thailand and the Republic of Vietnam (South Vietnam) were the founding members. These countries agreed to hold the Games biennially in June 1959 and the SEAP Games Federation Committee was formed thereafter.

The first SEAP Games were held in Bangkok from 12–17 December 1959, with more than 527 athletes and officials from 6 countries; Burma (now Myanmar), Laos, Malaya, Singapore, South Vietnam and Thailand participated in 12 sports.

At the 8th SEAP Games in 1975, the SEAP Federation considered the inclusion of Brunei, Indonesia, and the Philippines. These countries were formally admitted in 1977, the same year when SEAP Federation changed their name to the Southeast Asian Games Federation (SEAGF), and the games were known as the Southeast Asian Games. Despite its location closer to the Pacific archipelago than the Asian continent and not being a member of ASEAN, East Timor was admitted at the 22nd Southeast Asian Games in 2003 Hanoi–Ho Chi Minh City.

The 2009 Southeast Asian Games was the first time Laos has ever hosted a Southeast Asian Games (Laos had previously declined to host the 1965 Southeast Asian Peninsular Games citing financial difficulties). Running from 9–18 December, it has also commemorated the 50 years of the Southeast Asian Games, held in Vientiane, Laos. The South-East Asian Games were originally called the Southeast Asian Peninsular Games, and changed its name after the inclusion of Brunei, the Philippines and Indonesia in 1977. The first SEA Games were held in Bangkok in 1959, comprising more than 527 athletes and officials in 12 sports.

Symbol
The Southeast Asian Games symbol was introduced during the 1959 SEAP Games in Bangkok, depicting six rings that represent the six founding members and was used until the 1997 edition in Jakarta. The number of rings has increased to 10 during the 1999 edition in Brunei to reflect the inclusion of Singapore, which was admitted into the Southeast Asian Games Federation in 1961, and Brunei, Indonesia, and the Philippines, which joined the organization in 1977. The number of rings was again increased to 11 during the 2011 Games in Indonesia to reflect the federation's newest member, East Timor, which was admitted in 2003.
The official logo is a combination of five fingers holding the 10-circle chain Southeast Asian Games Federation logo, shaping an image of a dove, which is a symbol of peace. There were almost 1,000 entries for the logo. The organisers also revealed “For a Stronger Southeast Asia” as the slogan for the competitions.

Participating NOCs

Host cities

{| class="wikitable sortable mw-collapsible mw-collapsed" style="font-size: 85%; margin-left:auto; margin-right:auto;"
|+List of Southeast Asian Games
! rowspan="1" |Games
! rowspan="1" |Year
! rowspan="1" |Host cities
! rowspan="1" |Opened by
! rowspan="1" |Date
! rowspan="1" |Sports
! rowspan="1" |Events
! rowspan="1" |Nations
! rowspan="1" |Competitors
! rowspan="1" |Top-ranked team
! rowspan="1" |Ref
|-
! colspan="11" style="text-align:center;" |Southeast Asian Peninsular Games
|-
| align="center" |1
| align="center" |1959
| align="left" | Bangkok, Thailand
| align="left" |King Bhumibol Adulyadej
| align="center" |12–17 December 1959
| align="center" |12
| align="center" |N/A
| align="center" |6
| align="center" |518
| align="left" |
| align="center" |
|-
| align="center" |2
| align="center" |1961
| align="left" | Yangon, Burma
| align="left" |President Win Maung
| align="center" |11–16 December 1961
| align="center" |13
| align="center" |N/A
| align="center" |7
| align="center" |623
| align="left" |
| align="center" |
|-
| colspan="2" align="center" |1963
| colspan="9" align="center" |Awarded to Cambodia, cancelled due to domestic political situation
|-
| align="center" |3
| align="center" |1965
| align="left" | Kuala Lumpur, Malaysia
| align="left" |Yang di-Pertuan Agong Ismail Nasiruddin
| align="center" |14–21 December 1965
| align="center" |14
| align="center" |N/A
| align="center" |7
| align="center" |963
| align="left" |
| align="center" |
|-
| align="center" |4
| align="center" |1967
| align="left" | Bangkok, Thailand
| align="left" |King Bhumibol Adulyadej
| align="center" |9–16 December 1967
| align="center" |16
| align="center" |N/A
| align="center" |6
| align="center" |984
| align="left" |
| align="center" |
|-
| align="center" |5
| align="center" |1969
| align="left" | Yangon, Burma
| align="left" |Prime Minister Ne Win
| align="center" |6–13 December 1969
| align="center" |15
| align="center" |N/A
| align="center" |6
| align="center" |920
| align="left" |
| align="center" |
|-
| align="center" |6
| align="center" |1971
| align="left" | Kuala Lumpur, Malaysia
| align="left" |Yang di-Pertuan Agong Abdul Halim
| align="center" |6–13 December 1971
| align="center" |15
| align="center" |N/A
| align="center" |7
| align="center" |957
| align="left" |
| align="center" |
|-
| align="center" |7
| align="center" |1973
| align="left" |  Singapore City,Singapore
| align="left" |President Benjamin Sheares
| align="center" |1–8 September 1973
| align="center" |16
| align="center" |N/A
| align="center" |7
| align="center" |1632
| align="left" |
| align="center" |
|-
| align="center" |8
| align="center" |1975
| align="left" | Bangkok, Thailand
| align="left" |King Bhumibol Adulyadej
| align="center" |9–16 December 1975
| align="center" |18
| align="center" |N/A
| align="center" |4
| align="center" |1142
| align="left" |
| align="center" |
|-
! colspan="11" style="text-align:center;" |Southeast Asian Games
|-
| align="center" |9
| align="center" |1977
| align="left" | Kuala Lumpur, Malaysia
|Yang di-Pertuan Agong Yahya Petra
| align="center" |19–26 November 1977
| align="center" |18
| align="center" |N/A
| align="center" |7
| align="center" |N/A
|
| align="center" |
|-
| align="center" |10
| align="center" |1979
| align="left" | Jakarta, Indonesia
|President Suharto
| align="center" |21–30 September 1979
| align="center" |18
| align="center" |N/A
| align="center" |7
| align="center" |N/A
| align="left" |
| align="center" |
|-
| align="center" |11
| align="center" |1981
| align="left" | Manila, Philippines
|President Ferdinand Marcos
| align="center" |6–15 December 1981
| align="center" |18
| align="center" |N/A
| align="center" |7
| align="center" |≈1800
|
|
|-
| align="center" |12
| align="center" |1983
| align="left"| Singapore City, Singapore
|President Devan Nair
| align="center" |28 May – 6 June 1983
| align="center" |18
| align="center" |N/A
| align="center" |8
| align="center" |N/A
| align="left" |
| align="center" |
|-
| align="center" |13
| align="center" |1985
| align="left" | Bangkok, Thailand
|King Bhumibol Adulyadej
| align="center" |8–17 December 1985
| align="center" |18
| align="center" |N/A
| align="center" |8
| align="center" |N/A
|
| align="center" |
|-
| align="center" |14
| align="center" |1987
| align="left" | Jakarta, Indonesia
|President Suharto
| align="center" |9–20 September 1987
| align="center" |26
| align="center" |N/A
| align="center" |8
| align="center" |N/A
|
| align="center" |
|-
| align="center" |15
| align="center" |1989
| align="left" | Kuala Lumpur, Malaysia
|Yang di-Pertuan Agong Azlan Shah
| align="center" |20–31 August 1989
| align="center" |24
| align="center" |N/A
| align="center" |9
| align="center" |≈2800
|
| align="center" |
|-
| align="center" |16
| align="center" |1991
| align="left" | Manila, Philippines
|President Corazon Aquino
| align="center" |24 November – 3 December 1991
| align="center" |28
| align="center" |N/A
| align="center" |9
| align="center" |N/A
|
| align="center" |
|-
| align="center" |17
| align="center" |1993
| align="left" || Singapore City, Singapore
|President Wee Kim Wee
| align="center" |12–20 June 1993
| align="center" |29
| align="center" |N/A
| align="center" |9
| align="center" |≈3000
|
| align="center" |
|-
| align="center" |18
| align="center" |1995
| align="left" | Chiang Mai, Thailand
|Crown Prince Vajiralongkorn
| align="center" |9–17 December 1995
| align="center" |28
| align="center" |N/A
| align="center" |10
| align="center" |3262
|
| align="center" |
|-
| align="center" |19
| align="center" |1997
| align="left" | Jakarta, Indonesia
|President Suharto
| align="center" |11–19 October 1997
| align="center" |36
| align="center" |490
| align="center" |10
| align="center" |5179
|
| align="center" |
|-
| align="center" |20
| align="center" |1999
| align="left" | Bandar Seri Begawan, Brunei
|Sultan Hassanal Bolkiah
| align="center" |7–15 August 1999
| align="center" |21
| align="center" |233
| align="center" |10
| align="center" |2365
|
| align="center" |
|-
| align="center" |21
| align="center" |2001
| align="left" | Kuala Lumpur, Malaysia
|Yang di-Pertuan Agong Salahuddin
| align="center" |8–17 September 2001
| align="center" |32
| align="center" |391
| align="center" |10
| align="center" |4165
|
| align="center" |
|-
| align="center" |22
| align="center" |2003
| align="left" | Hanoi and Ho Chi Minh City, Vietnam
|Prime Minister Phan Văn Khải
| align="center" |5–13 December 2003
| align="center" |32
| align="center" |442
| align="center" |11
| align="center" |≈5000
|
| align="center" |
|-
| align="center" |23
| align="center" |2005
| align="left" | Manila, Philippines
|President Gloria Macapagal Arroyo
| align="center" |27 November – 5 December 2005
| align="center" |40
| align="center" |443
| align="center" |11
| align="center" |5336
|
| align="center" |
|-
| align="center" |24
| align="center" |2007
| align="left" | Nakhon Ratchasima, Thailand
|Crown Prince Vajiralongkorn
| align="center" |6–15 December 2007
| align="center" |43
| align="center" |475
| align="center" |11
| align="center" |5282
|
| align="center" |
|-
| align="center" |25
| align="center" |2009
| align="left" | Vientiane, Laos
|President Choummaly Sayasone
| align="center" |9–18 December 2009
| align="center" |29
| align="center" |372
| align="center" |11
| align="center" |3100
|
| align="center" |
|-
| align="center" |26
| align="center" |2011
| align="left" | Jakarta and Palembang, Indonesia
|President Susilo Bambang Yudhoyono
| align="center" |11–22 November 2011
| align="center" |44
| align="center" |545
| align="center" |11
| align="center" |5965
|
| align="center" |
|-
| align="center" |27
| align="center" |2013
| align="left" | Naypyidaw, Myanmar
|Vice President Nyan Tun
| align="center" |11–22 December 2013
| align="center" |37
| align="center" |460
| align="center" |11
| align="center" |4730
|
| align="center" |
|-
| align="center" |28
| align="center" |2015
| align="left" | Singapore City, Singapore
|President Tony Tan
| align="center" |5–16 June 2015
| align="center" |36
| align="center" |402
| align="center" |11
| align="center" |4370
|
| align="center" |
|-
| align="center" |29
| align="center" |2017
| align="left" | Kuala Lumpur, Malaysia
|Yang di-Pertuan Agong Muhammad V
| align="center" |19–30 August 2017
| align="center" |38
| align="center" |404
| align="center" |11
| align="center" |4709
|
| align="center" |
|-
| align="center" |30
| align="center" |2019
| align="left" | Philippines
|President Rodrigo Duterte
| align="center" |30 November – 11 December 2019
| align="center" |56
| align="center" |530
| align="center" |11
| align="center" |5630
|
| align="center" |
|-
| align="center" |31
| align="center" |2021
| align="left" | Hanoi, Vietnam
|President Nguyễn Xuân Phúc
| align="center" |12–23 May 2022
| align="center" |40
| align="center" |526
| align="center" |11
| align="center" |5467
|
| 
|-
| align="center" |32
| align="center" |2023
| align="left" | Phnom Penh, Cambodia
|King Norodom Sihamoni (expected)
| align="center" |5—17 May 2023
| colspan="6" align="center" |Future event
|-
| align="center" |33
| align="center" |2025
| align="left" | Bangkok,Thailand 
|King Vajiralongkorn (expected) 
| align="center" |9–20 December 2025
| colspan="7" align="center" |Future event
|-
| align="center" |34
| align="center" |2027
| align="left" | Kuala Lumpur, Malaysia
|Yang di-Pertuan Agong Ibrahim Ismail (expected)
| align="center" |TBD 2027
| colspan="7" align="center" |Future event
|-
| align="center" |35
| align="center" |2029
| align="left" | Singapore City, Singapore 
| align="center" |TBA
|
|
|
|
|
|
|
|-
| align="center" |36
| align="center" |2031
| align="left" |Vientiane,Laos Laos| colspan="8" align="center" |Future event|-
| align="center" |37
| align="center" |2033
| align="left" | Philippines| colspan="8" align="center" |Future event|-
| align="center" |38
| align="center" |2035
| align="left" |
 Jakarta and Palembang, Indonesia
| align="center" |TBA
|-
| align="center" |39
| align="center" |2037
| align="left" |
 Bandar Seri Begawan, Brunei
| align="center" |TBA
|-
| align="center" |40
| align="center" |2039
| align="left" |
 Naypyidaw, Myanmar
| align="center" |TBA

|}

The 1963 Southeast Asian Peninsular Games were canceled. As the designated host, Cambodia was not able to host the event due to instability in the country, along with a disagreement with the International Amateur Athletic Federation. The 3rd SEAP Games then passed to Laos as hosts, but they begged off the 1965 event citing financial difficulties.

Sports

According to the SEAGF Charter and Rules, a host nation must stage a minimum of 22 sports: the two compulsory sports from Category 1 (athletics and aquatics), in addition to a minimum of 14 sports from Category 2 (Olympics and Asian Games mandatory sports), and a maximum of 8 sports from Category 3 (shaded grey in the table below). Each sport shall not offer more than 5% of the total medal tally, except for athletics, aquatics and shooting (the shot was elevated for this category in 2013). For each sport and event to be included, a minimum of four countries must participate in it. Sports competed in the Olympic Games and Asian Games must be given priority.

All-time medal table
Corrected after balancing the data of the Olympic Council of Asia and other archived sites which had kept the previous Southeast Asian Games medal tables. Some information from the aforementioned sites are missing, incorrect and or not updated.SEAP Games FederationMedal TallySEA Games previous medal table

 ^[1] – Competed as Malaya in the inaugural games until 1961.
 ^[2] – The Republic of Vietnam was dissolved in July 1976 when it merged with the Democratic Republic of Vietnam (North Vietnam) to become the Socialist Republic of Vietnam, also known as Vietnam. Therefore, the medal counts for this country are considered to be as until 1975. In the 1989 edition, a unified Vietnam rejoined the games with a new name and flag. Medals won by South Vietnam are already combined here. The International Olympic Committee (IOC) does not use codes for South Vietnam anymore after the unification with North Vietnam.

 ^[3] – Competed as Burma until 1987.
 ^[4] – Competed as Kampuchea, and Khmer Republic.

List of multiple Southeast Asian Games medalists

Various individuals have won multiple medals at the Games, including the preceding Southeast Asian Peninsular Games.

As of 2019, Singaporean swimmer Joscelin Yeo has won the most Southeast Asian Games medals with 55 (40 gold, 12 silver, 3 bronze). She reached this milestone during the 2005 Games, overtaking the previous record of 39 gold medals set by another Singaporean swimmer Patricia Chan.

Criticism
The games are unique in that it has no official limits to the number of sports and events to be contested, and the range can be decided by the organizing host pending approval by the Southeast Asian Games Federation. Aside from mandatory sports, the host is free to drop or introduce other sports or events (See Southeast Asian Games sports).

This leeway has resulted in hosts maximizing their medal hauls by dropping sports disadvantageous to themselves relative to their peers and the introduction of obscure sports, often at short notice, thus preventing most other nations from building credible opponents.Sea Games reduced to a carnival Examples of these include:

 At the 2001 Southeast Asian Games, Malaysia introduced pétanque, and netball.
 At the 2003 Southeast Asian Games, Vietnam added fin swimming and shuttlecock, and wushu offered 28 gold medals instead of the usual 16.
 In the 2005 Southeast Asian Games, the Philippines added arnis, a demonstration sport in 2003, with six sets of medals, and the Philippines bagged three gold medals. 2005 also saw the addition of baseball, dance sport, and softball.
 At the 2007 Southeast Asian Games, Thailand added new categories of sepak takraw. In addition, the Thai Sepak Takraw Federation decided to replace the traditional rattan ball for a rubber ball, which was uncommon in other participating countries, causing a great deal of controversy and led to Malaysia boycotting the sport. Consequently, Thailand won all 8 events. Apart from this, local organizers also added futsal in this edition of the games.
 In the 2011 Southeast Asian Games, Indonesia the organizers decided to cancel the team events in table tennis and reduced the number of events in shooting to 14, following the decisions made by the International Sports Federation to reduce the number of events in the World Championships. At the same time, bridge, kenpō, paragliding, vovinam and wall climbing were introduced.
 In the 2013 Southeast Asian Games, Myanmar introduced its indigenous sport Chinlone. The host won six of eight gold medals in the event. They also introduced board games with events on Sittuyin, a traditional Burmese board game, and chess.
 In the 2017 Southeast Asian Games, Malaysia introduced cricket, indoor hockey and three winter sport events, figure skating, short track speed skating and ice hockey.
 In the 2019 Southeast Asian Games, the Philippines added beach handball, duathlon, e-sports, jiu-jitsu, kickboxing, kurash, sambo, skateboarding, surfing and wakeboarding. Certain events in Modern Pentathlon were made in non-Olympic formats.

 See also 

 Events of the OCA (Continental)
 Asian Games
 Asian Winter Games
 Asian Youth Games
 Asian Beach Games
 Asian Indoor and Martial Arts Games

 Events of the OCA (Subregional)
 Central Asian Games
 East Asian Games'' (now East Asian Youth Games)
 South Asian Games
 West Asian Games

 Events of the APC (Continental)
 Asian Para Games
 Asian Youth Para Games

 Events of the APC (Subregional)
 ASEAN Para Games

References

External links
 Olympic Council of Asia Regional Hosting List
 SEA Games Federation
 Medal Tally 1959-1995
 Medal Tally
 History of the SEA Games
 SEA Games previous medal table
 SEA Games members

 
ASEAN sports events
Asian international sports competitions
Recurring sporting events established in 1959
Multi-sport events in Asia